Ceraeochrysa elegans is a green lacewing species in the genus Ceraeochrysa. It is found in Costa Rica.

References

External links 

Chrysopidae
Insects described in 1998
Insects of Central America